Rena Lara is a census-designated place and unincorporated community located along Mississippi Highway 1 in southwestern Coahoma County, Mississippi, United States. Rena Lara is located on the former Riverside Division of the Yazoo and Mississippi Valley Railroad. Rena Lara was once home to two general stores, two grocery stores, and the Richardson and May Land & Planting Company.

it has a post office, with the ZIP code 38767. The post office first began operation in 1895.

Pepper Sharpe, a Negro league pitcher, was born in Rena Lara.

It was first named as a CDP in the 2020 Census which listed a population of 123.

Demographics

2020 census

Note: the US Census treats Hispanic/Latino as an ethnic category. This table excludes Latinos from the racial categories and assigns them to a separate category. Hispanics/Latinos can be of any race.

References

Unincorporated communities in Coahoma County, Mississippi
Unincorporated communities in Mississippi
Census-designated places in Coahoma County, Mississippi